The Superior Civilian Service Award (Pre-2014 change) is the second highest award of the Department of the Army Honorary Awards for Department of the Army Employees. It consists of a medal, lapel pin and certificate. It is granted by Commanders of ACOMs, ASCCs, and DRUs; members of the SES serving as the director of a DRU; and the AASA for HQDA. May be further delegated to commanders MG and above or civilian equivalent and to Principal Officials of HQDA. The medal is the civil service equivalent of the military Legion of Merit. Originally established on 26 January 1959 as the Meritorious Civilian Service Award, the name of the award was changed to its current name in November 2014.

Criteria 
Nominations for this award reflect superior service, achievement or heroism of a higher degree than that recognized by the Meritorious Civilian Service Award. Employees who have shown excellent performance through the previous receipt of honorary or monetary performance awards, can be considered for this award. Eligibility is determined by measuring contributions against the following example levels of achievement: 
Accomplished assigned duties in a superior manner, leading team members to higher productivity, or completing a complex project more effectively and efficiently than required.
Demonstrated a high level of initiative and skill in devising new and improved equipment, work methods, and procedures; inventions resulting in substantial savings in expenses such as manpower, time, space, and materials, or improved safety or health of the workforce. 
Exhibited courage or competence in an emergency, while performing assigned duties, resulting in direct benefit to the Government or its personnel. This award is comparable to the military Legion of Merit.

Description
The medal of the award is a silver disc  diameter with a laurel wreath around the circumference surrounding the Great Seal of the United States on the obverse. The reverse contains the inscription FOR DEPARTMENT OF THE ARMY SUPERIOR CIVILIAN SERVICE--TO. The medal is suspended from a crimson ribbon 35 mm in width with two thin white stripes near the edge and a central stripe of white bisected by a stripe of ultramarine blue in the center.

Background 

 The medal was established as the Meritorious Civilian Service Award by directive of the Secretary of the Army on 26 January 1959.
 In November 2014, the Secretary of the Army approved a modification to the Department of the Army Civilian Service Medals in order to make their nomenclature more consistent with their military equivalents. At that time the award was renamed the Superior Civilian Service Medal and the ribbon and design were changed. This award consists of a regularsize medal, miniature size medal, service ribbon, lapel button and certificate.

See also 
 Department of the Army Civilian Awards
 Awards and decorations of the United States government

References 

Awards and decorations of the United States Department of Defense